Harold Caballeros (born June 20, 1956 in Guatemala City Guatemala) is a Guatemalan lawyer, businessman, politician and is involved in the academia. He currently serves as Secretary General of the Visión con Valores party, VIVA and as Dean of the Universidad San Pablo de Guatemala (USPG), and has given several lectures in over 45 countries in Latin America, Europe and Asia.

Actively participated as facilitator in the Country Vision Plan (Plan Visión de País), which consolidates role of political parties as interlocutors between society and state.

Studies 

He studied elementary through highschool, graduating in a post-secondary in Arts and Sciences at Liceo Javier, Guatemala. He studied law and notary in the Universidad Francisco Marroquin's Law School, he did a Masters in Business Administration from the University of Miami, Florida and a Masters in International Relations from The Fletcher School of Law and Diplomacy. He also has a doctorate in theology and has done graduate studies at the Research and Development Center for International Affairs, Weatherhead of the Harvard University.

Life 

Harold Caballeros was born in Guatemala City in 1956, son of Osberto Caballeros, now deceased, and Coralia Lopez.

Family 

He has been married 27 years with Cecilia Arimany. They have four children: Harold, Andrea, Christina and David.

El Shaddai Ministries 

Founder of El Shaddai Ministries, which consists of a local church with more than 12,000 members in Guatemala City and more than eighty branch churches in several countries in America and Europe. After serving for over 20 years as Pastor, Caballeros announced his retirement in 2004, with his wife staying as the head of the pastoral team.

Radios Vision Corporation 

He is president and founder of Radios Vision Corporation  which consists of 25 radio stations established in 1996.

Political career 

In 2007 he started his political career by founding the Vision con Valores Party, VIVA  where he serves as secretary general. On August 25 of the same year, he held the party's first general assembly in the Industrial Park in Guatemala City.
VIVA is a social movement, rooted in a political party with an ideology of long-term vision and values, based on classical republicanism. It has representation in 22 states (Departamentos)in Guatemala. Currently working on the project National Development Agenda (ADN for its acronym in Spanish), which designs the profile of Guatemala in 2050 and the actions to take to ensure that future.

The ADN provides a model of development for Guatemala, according to its competitive advantages and proper use of the resources it has, taking as reference the values and culture. It is supported by the Centre for Studies and Research for Development in Latin America (CEIDAL) in the design, development, audit and measurement of the implementation of public policies.

Social Projection

Foundations 

Has established two foundations: FUEDES (Fundación Educativa El Shaddai), which has 19 schools in different parts of the country based on Christian education as a mean to inculcate a worldview of values and principles that affect the nation. And Fundación Manos de Amor, an institution that provides comprehensive humanitarian assistance, education and sustainable development projects.

Universidad San Pablo de Guatemala

On March 23, 2006 founded the Universidad San Pablo de Guatemala (USPG) for which he is the Rector. The University's vision, came from the need for an institution that could contribute to the formation of the society through appropriate education, through which students can impact not only in academia but also on the principles, ethical and moral values. In this way as professionals, can be agents of transformation in the society they live in.

Literary work 
He has written several motivational books, personal growth and spiritual formation.

References

External links 

 
 
 
 Visión con Valores
 Universidad San Pablo de Guatemala (USPG)
 El Shaddai Ministries
 Fundación Manos de Amor
 Corporación Radios Visión 
 Visión con Valores Leadership

1956 births
Living people
People from Guatemala City
Guatemalan diplomats
Guatemalan politicians
20th-century Guatemalan lawyers
Guatemalan people of French descent
Guatemalan clergy
Guatemalan Protestants